Ashley Earley (born March 9, 1983) is an American basketball player.

Ashley Earley was born to parents Lee and Linda Earley and raised in Memphis, Tennessee.  She attended Briarcrest HS in Memphis. Earley was named a WBCA All-American (high school). She participated in the 2001 WBCA High School All-America Game, where she scored nine points.

The Earley Trophy Case 
2001 Tennessee Gatorade Player of the Year
2001 Tennessee Miss Basketball
1998 & 2001 State Tournament MVP
2001 Best of the Preps Player of the Year (Memphis)
2001 Parade First Team All-American
2001 USA Today Second Team All-American
2001 Naismith Finalist
2000 NIKE All-American
1998 & 1999 WBCA/Reebok Underclass All-American

She attended Vanderbilt University in Nashville, Tennessee from 2001 to 2005 and graduated with a psychology degree.

In the 2005 WNBA Draft, she was drafted as the third round selection of the Indiana Fever. After being waived, she played the 2005–06 season overseas with Maccabi Tel Kabir in Tel Aviv, Israel. 

In May, 2005, Earley joined the athletic department staff at The University of Alabama as the graduate assistant coach.  Her former Vanderbilt University Commodore teammate, Ashley McElhiney also joined as the director of women's basketball operations.

In May 2009, Early left Tennessee Tech to join the University of Rhode Island as an assistant coach.  In June 2010, she became assistant coach at Marquette University.

Vanderbilt statistics
Source

Notes

External links
Former Players for Maccabi Tel Kabir
Ashley Earley Joins Teammate at Alabama (2005-05-26)
Ashley McElhiney Director of Basketball Operations (2005-06-02)

1983 births
Living people
American women's basketball coaches
American women's basketball players
Basketball players from Memphis, Tennessee
Indiana Fever draft picks
Indiana Fever players
Sportspeople from Memphis, Tennessee
Vanderbilt Commodores women's basketball players